Runcorn is an industrial town and cargo port in the Borough of Halton in Cheshire, England. Its population in 2011 was 61,789. Runcorn is on the southern bank of the River Mersey, where the estuary narrows to form the Runcorn Gap.

Runcorn was founded by Ethelfleda in 915 AD as a fortification to guard against Viking invasion at a narrowing of the River Mersey. Under Norman rule, Runcorn fell under the Barony of Halton and an Augustinian abbey was established here in 1115. It remained a small, isolated settlement until the Industrial Revolution when the extension of the Bridgewater Canal to Runcorn in 1776 established it as a port which would link Liverpool with inland Manchester and Staffordshire. The docks enabled the growth of industry, initially shipwrights and sandstone quarries. In the late 18th and early 19th centuries, it was a spa and health resort but this ended with the growth of polluting industries, especially soap and chemical works. In 1964, Runcorn was designated a new town and expanded eastward, swallowing neighbouring settlements and more than doubling its population.

Three bridges span the River Mersey and the Manchester Ship Canal at Runcorn: the Silver Jubilee Bridge, Mersey Gateway, and Runcorn Railway Bridge. Its location between Liverpool and Manchester and its links to the rail, motorway and canal networks have made it a centre for manufacturing, logistics, and wholesale and retail. The town's motto is Navem Mercibus Implere (Latin for "fill the ship with goods"), a classical quotation from Juvenal.

History

Early history
The earliest written reference to the town is in the Anglo-Saxon Chronicle, where it is spelled "Rumcofan", literally meaning "a wide cove or bay". This word is derived from the Old English words "rúm" ("wide" or "broad") and "cofa" ("cave" or "cove"). Other historical spellings of Runcorn include "Rumcoven", "Ronchestorn", "Runckhorne", and "Runcorne".

Little is known about the early history of the settlement but isolated findings of objects from the Stone, Bronze, and Iron Ages have been made and there is evidence of a Roman presence in the area.

The first recorded event in its history is the building by Æthelflæd of a fortification at Runcorn to protect the northern frontier of her kingdom of Mercia against the Vikings in 915. The fort was built on Castle Rock overlooking the River Mersey at Runcorn Gap.

Medieval

Following the Norman conquest, Runcorn was not mentioned in the 1086 Domesday survey, although surrounding settlements were. William the Conqueror granted the earldom of Chester to Hugh d'Avranches who granted the barony of Halton to Nigel. It is likely that Nigel erected a motte and bailey castle on Halton Hill in the 1070s.

In 1115, Nigel's son, William Fitznigel, founded an Augustinian Priory at Runcorn. In 1391, the priory was raised to the higher status of abbey. In 1536, the monastery was dissolved, and around nine years later, the buildings and some of the monastic lands were sold to Sir Richard Brooke who converted the habitable part of the abbey into a house.

In 1565, Rocksavage, an Elizabethan Hall, was constructed for Sir John Savage in Clifton, now part of Runcorn.

English Civil War

During the Civil War, Halton Castle was held for the Royalists by John Savage, 2nd Earl Rivers, the Steward of Halton. It fell twice to Parliamentarian Roundheads. The first siege was led by Sir William Brereton in 1643; the second was during the following year. Following this, a "Council of War" was held in Warrington in 1646 at which it was decided that the castle should be slighted.

In 1656, Runcorn was described as being "nothing but a fair parish church, a parsonage and a few scattered tenements". And so it remained for over a century, an isolated and poor hamlet. The only through traffic used the ferry which crossed from Runcorn to the north bank of the River Mersey.

Industrialisation

During the 18th century, water transport had been improved in the area by the Mersey and Irwell Navigation, the Bridgewater Canal and the Trent and Mersey Canal. This gave Runcorn waterway connections with most of the interior of England through the canal system and with the sea along the River Mersey, thus forming the basis for the development of the Port of Runcorn.

Later came the Runcorn to Latchford Canal linking with the Mersey and Irwell Navigation, and the Weston Canal which gave better access to the Weaver Navigation system.

Industries began to develop within and around the town, in particular shipbuilding, engineering, chemical manufacturing, tanning, and sandstone quarrying. Towards the end of the 18th century and in the early years of the 19th century, the town was a health resort.

The growth of industry did not diminish Runcorn's late 18th and early 19th century reputation as a health resort and the "Montpelier of England". In 1822 the town's first Saltwater Baths opened followed by new visitor accommodation in Belvedere Terrace in 1831.

In the middle of the century, the growing wealth of the town and its industrialists saw the construction of several new landmarks, including Halton Grange, St Paul's Methodist Chapel and All Saints' Church.

For hundreds of years, the only means of crossing the River Mersey at this point had been by the Runcorn ferry. Thomas Telford proposed a  single span suspension bridge as early as 1817, but it was not until 1868 that the first bridge, Runcorn Railway Bridge, was opened across the Mersey at Runcorn. This gave the town direct rail links with Liverpool and the rest of the country.

Runcorn was becoming an industrialised and highly polluted town. During the later 19th century the town became increasingly dominated by the chemical and tanning industries. In the 1880s a pipeline was opened between Northwich and Weston Point, supplying brine to the salt works and in 1896 the Castner Kellner chemical works was established.

In 1894 the Manchester Ship Canal was opened throughout its length. This allowed ocean-going ships to travel inland as far as Salford, some of them calling at the port of Runcorn. The rise in population between 1881 and 1891 and the drop by 1901 is explained by the number of people involved in constructing the ship canal.

In 1905, the Widnes-Runcorn Transporter Bridge opened, giving a direct link for vehicular traffic for the first time between the two towns. This would not be replaced until 1961 with the construction of Runcorn Road Bridge (since renamed the Silver Jubilee Bridge) which allowed a more efficient means of road traffic across Runcorn Gap.

During the first half of the 20th century, the industry of the town continued to be dominated by chemicals and tanning. This growth was largely due to government fixed-priced cost contracts for tanned hides. In 1926, four chemical companies merged to form Imperial Chemical Industries (ICI).

During the second half of the 20th century, the tanneries closed (the last to close was the Highfield Tannery in the late 1960s) and the chemical industry declined. At the same time, light industry developed together with warehouses and distribution centres.

Second World War

In 1937, ICI began to build a new factory for mustard gas production at their Randle plant on Wigg Island. The ICI chemical plants at Runcorn featured in the Gestapo Black Book as a company of special interest. But although the works at Weston Point were discussed at Luftwaffe briefings in 1940, the town was never deliberately targeted and was subject only to very limited bombing.

New Town development

In September 1963, the Ministry of Housing and Local Government published a draft of the Runcorn New Town (Designation) Order which would allocate  in and around Runcorn for development of a new town under the New Towns Act 1946. The ministry cited the urgent need for more housing to reduce overcrowding in Liverpool and to increase the rate of slum clearance there. Runcorn was chosen because of its strong road, rail and canal connections, ample water supply, convenient location on the Mersey Estuary for the disposal of effluent, established industry and the availability of land for more.

Following objections to the draft order, a public Local Inquiry was held at Runcorn from 10 to 12 December 1963. The subsequent report accepted the location in principle and the proposed population of 90,000. It did, however, recommend that  around the village of Sutton Weaver to the south of the Chester–Manchester and Crewe–Liverpool railway lines be excluded from the designated area, partly to preserve its highly productive agricultural land. The minister, Keith Joseph, accepted the report's recommendations and the designation order was made on 10 April 1964.

The new town masterplan published in 1966 more than doubled the population as it encompassed neighbouring settlements and created new housing estates to the south and east. The key features of the new town were its unique housing and estate designs, segregated pedestrian pathways, Busway, extensive landscaped green space, separate industrial areas and new town centre.

The new town centre was designated at the geographical heart of the expanded town with Shopping City, an American style enclosed mall, as its focus. This was a source of conflict between Arthur Ling, the new town Master Planner, and Fred Roche, Chief Architect. Whereas Ling envisaged a centre reminiscent of a citadel or acropolis at the base of Halton Castle, Roche preferred to expand the existing town centre, partly to placate the Urban District Council and existing traders. The new Halton site was favoured and Shopping City opened in 1972.

However, the Urban District Council secured a commitment from the Development Corporation to continue a programme of regeneration which the council had already begun. In 1971, the Development Corporation published Master Plan Amendment No.1 which focused on the urban renewal of the Old Town centre, now designated a smaller 'district centre'. The plan sought to increase public open space,
reduce shopping provision, rationalise roads and renew housing stock. It also included plans to widen the Runcorn-Widnes Bridge from two to four lanes and create a new system of junctions between the bridge and the expressway.

The masterplan was amended for the second and final time in 1975. Amendment No.2 extended the expressway further to the east and redesignated land at Sandymoor intended for industrial use to residential. The Runcorn Development Corporation merged with Warrington Development Corporation on 1 April 1981 and was wound up on 30 September 1989.

Much of the architecture of the new town was innovative, especially the Southgate development designed by Sir James Stirling and built between 1970 and 1977. Stirling's housing development was beset with problems and it was demolished in the early 1990s. In 2002, the Castlefields Partnership (made up of English Partnerships and Halton Borough Council) was created to comprehensively redevelop the Castlefields estate, including the demolition of over 700 deck access flats.

Governance

Local government

Runcorn is unparished with the exception of Sandymoor, and a large part of the Whitehouse Industrial Estate which falls under Preston Brook Parish Council. The local authority is Halton Borough Council for which the town is divided into nine electoral wards, each electing three councillors.

At the time of the Domesday survey, Runcorn was in the hundred of Tunendune, but later, and until the early 19th century, Runcorn was part of the Bucklow hundred.

Under the Runcorn Improvement Act 1852, a board of Improvement Commissioners was established to administer the civil government of the town. By the Local Government Act 1894, the administration of the town and the surrounding areas was divided into Runcorn Urban District and Runcorn Rural District. Initially the urban district consisted of only the built-up area of Runcorn itself. By 1937, this area had been extended to include the communities of Weston and Weston Point to the south. In 1964, Runcorn was designated as a New Town and greatly expanded so that by 1971 it had grown to incorporate the village of Halton.

Runcorn Urban District was abolished in 1974 under the Local Government Act 1972 when it merged with the Municipal Borough of Widnes and parts of Runcorn Rural District and Whiston Rural District to form the Borough of Halton under Halton Borough Council and Cheshire County Council. In 1998, Halton Borough Council became a unitary authority within the ceremonial county of Cheshire. In April 2014, Halton Borough Council joined five other local authorities in Merseyside to form the Liverpool City Region.

Westminster representation
The western area of the town is in the Halton constituency and the eastern part in the Weaver Vale constituency. Since the 1997 general election, the Member of Parliament (MP) for the Halton constituency has been Derek Twigg of the Labour Party. Weaver Vale is a marginal seat and has switched parties several times since its creation in 1997.

Before the Reform Act 1832, Runcorn was in the constituency of Cheshire which was represented by two Members of Parliament. Following the Reform Act, the town was placed in the North Cheshire constituency and from 1868 in the Mid Cheshire constituency. From 1885 to 1950 the town was in the constituency of Northwich. The constituency of Runcorn was created by a 1948 Act of Parliament and Dennis Vosper was the first to be elected to the seat in 1950. In 1964, he was succeeded by Mark Carlisle who held the seat until the constituency of Runcorn was abolished in 1983 and split between the constituencies of Halton and Warrington South.

Geography

Topography

Runcorn is situated on a spur projecting into the River Mersey, which flows to the north and then to the west of the town. On the north bank of the river is another spur forming the West Bank area of Widnes; together these form Runcorn Gap, a narrowing of the River Mersey. The town is bounded to the southwest by the Weaver Navigation; to the south by the Chester–Manchester and Crewe–Liverpool railway lines; and to the east by the West Coast Main Line until the village of Moore. A series of valleys is formed by high points at Runcorn Hill (75m AOD), Halton Castle (75m AOD), Windmill Hill (70m AOD) and Keckwick Hill (75m AOD).

Runcorn Gap is crossed by three bridges: Runcorn Railway Bridge (which carries the Liverpool branch of the West Coast Main Line), the Silver Jubilee Bridge and the Mersey Gateway which carries the A533. A system of dual carriageways called 'expressways' form a figure of 8 around the town. The Central Expressway runs through the centre of the town in a north–south direction and is the main through-road. It connects to the M56 motorway which cuts into the south of the town.

To the west of the Central Expressway lies the Old Town of Runcorn, Higher Runcorn, Weston, Weston Point and Clifton (formerly Rocksavage), and the new town estates of Halton Brook and Halton Lodge. To the east are the formerly separate villages of Halton and Norton, and the new town estates of Castlefields, Palacefields, Windmill Hill, Murdishaw, Brookvale, Hallwood Park, Beechwood and Sandymoor. The density of housing is generally high, but there are open green areas, in particular heathland on Runcorn Hill and the extensive Town Park created as part of the new town. Housing is typically situated within the expressways and industry outside.

Geology

The Runcorn area drains into the River Mersey to the north and the River Weaver to the south.

The bedrock geology of the River Mersey and the northern and western fringes of Runcorn is Sherwood Sandstone and pebbly sandstone. To the south there is a transition to siltstone, sandstone and predominantly Mercia Mudstone. The primary sedimentary rock is New Red Sandstone.

The superficial geology is varied with pockets of sand and diamicton along the lower-lying land adjacent to the Mersey and through Runcorn. Sand and gravel becomes common on the southern fringes of the town and elsewhere there are small pockets of clay, silt, sand and gravel.

Ecology
There are two Sites of Special Scientific Interest within the town: Floodbrook Clough and the Mersey Estuary. Floodbrook Clough in Beechwood is an Ancient Semi-Natural Woodland and one of the best examples in Cheshire of clough woodland on keuper marl.

There are five Local Nature Reserves designated under the National Parks and Access to the Countryside Act 1949: Runcorn Hill, Dorchester Park, Oxmoor Woods, Wigg Island and Murdishaw Valley.

Demography

Population growth
Early census statistics for the town include only the areas known now as the Old Town and Higher Runcorn. In 1936, Runcorn Urban District grew to incorporate the neighbouring village of Weston. The present statistical boundaries of Runcorn were defined in the Runcorn New Town (Designation) Order 1964 which greatly expanded the town to the east.

The population of Runcorn in 1664 has been estimated as 305.

Religion

The 2011 census showed that 70.1% of people living in Runcorn declared themselves to be Christian, significantly higher than the national average in England of 59.4%. 23.5% stated that they had "no religion" and 5.5% made no religious claims. Those stating their religions as Buddhist, Hindu, Jewish, Islam, or Sikh amounted to 0.8%.

The town's Anglican churches are part of the Diocese of Chester and the Deanery of Frodsham. The parish church is All Saints Church, and there are 10 other Anglican churches in the town. Five Catholic churches can be found in Runcorn and are administered by the Diocese of Shrewsbury.

There are two Methodist chapels and several shared churches. Wicksten Drive Christian Centre is shared between Anglicans and Methodists. Hallwood Ecumenical Parish in Beechwood and Palace Fields consists of 2 churches, both recognised by the Church of England, the Methodist Church and the United Reformed Church. There is also a Pentecostal church, two independent evangelical churches, a Church of Jesus Christ of Latter-day Saints chapel, a spiritualist church, and a Jehovah's Witnesses Kingdom Hall.

In 2013, the former Waterloo Hotel was converted into a Buddhist temple by Wat Phra Singh. , there are five resident monks.

Ethnicity
In the 2011 census, of Runcorn's 61,789 residents, 97.8% were White, with 96.3% identifying as White British. Mixed/multiple ethnic groups made up 1.2%, Asian/Asian British 0.7%, Black/African/Caribbean/Black British 0.2%, and Other/Arab 0.1%. 98.5% had English as a first language.

Economy
Runcorn has a higher proportion of people working in manufacturing, logistics, and wholesale and retail than the average for England. Chemical manufacturing has been the town's dominant sector since the 19th century, but the local economy has increasingly diversified into other advanced manufacturing sectors, such as aerospace and automotive, as well as services and logistics.

The main industrial areas of the town are Astmoor, Manor Park, Whitehouse, the Heath and Weston Point. Sci-Tech Daresbury is to the southeast of the town. The main retail and leisure area is Shopping City in the centre of the town with a smaller district centre at the old town.

Manufacturing and chemicals

The town's chemical industry was dominated for many years by ICI's Chlor Chemical division. But since 2001, Inovyn (a wholly owned subsidiary of Ineos) has operated the extensive chemical works in the west of the town, employing 750 people in 2020. In Runcorn, Invoyn manufactures chlorine, caustic soda and chlorinated derivatives. It also produces salt, made from brine transported by pipeline from the saltfields of central Cheshire, and sulphuric acid. Several other chemical manufacturers also have a presence at the site, including Koura (formerly Mexichem Fluor), Industrial Chemicals, Packed Chlorine Limited, VYNOVA and Runcorn MCP Ltd (a joint venture between INOVYN and VYNOVA). The site is considered to be of strategic national importance to the UK. The site includes two independently owned power stations; the 810 MW natural gas fired Rocksavage Power Station and the Runcorn Energy Recovery Facility operated by Viridor which also supplies heat to the Inovyn facility. ICI's other former site in Runcorn comprising offices and laboratories is now the Heath Business and Technical Park, which provides office, laboratory, conference, and leisure facilities.

Other large employers include advanced manufacturing firms Sigmatex (manufacturer of carbon fibre), Héroux-Devtek (manufacturer of aircraft landing gear), Whitford (manufacturer of speciality coatings), Teva (manufacturer of pharmaceuticals) and Fresenius Kabi (manufacturer of medical and pharmaceutical products). Drinks manufacturer, Diageo, has maintained a packaging plant at Runcorn since 1970 which packages Guinness, Pimm's, Kilkenny and Smirnoff Ice for distribution in Great Britain.

Sci-Tech Daresbury is a National Science and Innovation Campus to the south east of Runcorn. The campus offers lab space, offices and workshops to rent. It is home to the largest supercomputer in Europe and the Virtual Engineering Centre which works with Bentley motor cars, BAE Systems and Jaguar Land Rover. The site also houses Daresbury Laboratory which employs over 300 staff specialising in accelerator science, bio-medicine, physics, chemistry, materials, engineering and computational science.

Logistics

Runcorn's position between Liverpool and Manchester airports and its links to the rail, motorway and canal networks have made it a centre for logistics. There are two ports in the west of the town on the Manchester Ship Canal. Runcorn Docks is owned by the Manchester Ship Canal Company, which is part of the Peel Ports Group. Weston Point Docks is operated by FLX Logistics.

There are several large logistics depots across Runcorn, including Eddie Stobart Group's road haulage site and driver training school in Manor Park, the Downton haulage depot at the Whitehouse Industrial Estate, and an NHS Supply Chain Depot in Astmoor Industrial Estate.

Services
There has been a shift in employment from manufacturing to service industries. In 1991, 34% worked in the manufacturing sector and 61% were in the service sector. By 2004, 17% were in manufacturing jobs and 78% were in service jobs. This trend in the local region is demonstrated in this chart which shows the regional "gross value added" of Halton and Warrington at current basic prices, with figures in millions of pounds.

 includes hunting and forestry
 includes energy and construction
 includes financial intermediation services indirectly measured
 Components may not sum to totals due to rounding

Runcorn has two shopping centres. The original shopping area was in the older part of the town on High Street, Regent Street and Church Street. This centre continues to exist, but with the coming of the new town, has declined. In the centre of the new town, Runcorn Shopping City is an enclosed shopping mall with two attached bus stations. Adjacent to it is Trident Retail Park containing shopping outlets and a cinema and nearby is a large Asda superstore that opened in 1989.

Transport

The Runcorn New Town Masterplan created three distinct types of road: busways, expressways and local roads. In addition, there is a network of dedicated cycleways in the town.

The Runcorn Busway was the world's first bus rapid transit system in 1971. First conceived in the Runcorn New Town Masterplan in 1966, it opened for services in October 1971 and all  were operational by 1980. It is a road network for use by buses only and, unlike guided busways or bus lanes, it is a totally separate road system, not running alongside (or down the middle of) existing roads. The central station is at Runcorn Shopping City where buses arrive on dedicated raised busways to two enclosed stations. Professor Arthur Ling, Runcorn Development Corporation's Master Planner, claimed to have invented the concept while sketching on the back of an envelope. Bus services are provided by Arriva North West, Anthony's Travel, MP Travel, Warrington's Own Buses, Ashcroft Travel, Halton Community Transport and Stagecoach Merseyside & South Lancashire. Two coach companies operate from the town; Selwyns Travel, and Anthony's Travel.

The expressways form a ring road around the town in a figure of eight and are intended to keep all through traffic off the local roads. This system links north to Widnes and Liverpool by the A533 over the Mersey Gateway bridge, east to Warrington by the A56, south to Northwich and north Cheshire by the A533, and west by the A557 to the M56 and to Frodsham. The M56 links to the M6 and, to the north of Widnes, the A557 links to the M62.

There are two railway stations. Runcorn, located in the old town, is on the Liverpool branch of the West Coast Main Line, and is managed by Avanti West Coast, which provides services between Liverpool Lime Street and London Euston. West Midlands Trains run a service between Liverpool and Birmingham New Street that calls at the station. Runcorn East station, located in the Murdishaw district of the new town, is managed by Transport for Wales, and provides services to Warrington, Manchester, Chester and North Wales.

Landmarks

There are two Grade I listed buildings and scheduled monuments in Runcorn: Halton Castle and Norton Priory. Halton Castle is one of two remaining Norman castles in Cheshire, built in 1071 and reconstructed in local sandstone in the 13th century. The castle was slighted following the Civil War and the gatehouse converted to a courthouse in 1737, now The Castle public house and a Grade II* listed building in its own right. Norton Priory, now a museum, is the most excavated monastic site in Europe, consisting of the ruins of an Abbey, 12th century undercroft and 18th century Walled Garden. Both Norton Priory and Halton Castle are managed by Norton Priory Museum Trust Limited.

Most Grade II* listed buildings in the town are around the base of Halton Castle, including Seneschal's House (1598), Halton Old Hall (1693), Chesshyre Library (1730) and Halton Vicarage (1739). Hallwood (1710), a former mansion house, is also Grade II* listed and its former stable block is Grade II. But both have been derelict since the Tricorn public house closed in 2017. The town's 19th century Anglican churches are also listed buildings, including the Grade II* All Saints (1849) and St John's (1897), and the Grade II Holy Trinity (1838), Christ Church (1841) and St Mary's (1851).

The Runcorn home of the Duke of Bridgewater, Bridgewater House, is a prominent landmark and Grade II listed building on the banks of the Manchester Ship Canal where a flight of locks from his canal once stood. The home of a later industrialist, Thomas Johnson, became Runcorn Town Hall, a Grade II listed Italianate building with similarities to Osborne House on the Isle of Wight.

The landmarks largest in scale are the three bridges which span the River Mersey and the Manchester Ship Canal at Runcorn. Runcorn Railway Bridge and the Silver Jubilee Bridge are Grade II* and II listed buildings respectively while the Mersey Gateway Bridge was officially opened in 2018 by Queen Elizabeth II and the Duchess of Sussex.

Runcorn War Memorial is Grade II listed and commemorates those who died in the First and Second World Wars, as well as those killed in later conflicts. The garden contains a statue of Thomas Alfred Jones who was awarded the Victoria Cross in the First World War. There is a memorial in Halton Village commemorating residents who served in the Boer War.

Runcorn Shopping City, at the heart of the New Town, was designed by Fred Roche CBE and at the time of its construction was the largest covered shopping centre in Europe. It was opened by Queen Elizabeth II in 1972.

Culture

Theatre and cinema

The Brindley is a theatre and arts centre which opened in 2004. It is situated in the old town and named after James Brindley, engineer of the adjacent Bridgewater Canal. It contains a proscenium theatre seating 420 and a multi-purpose theatre seating 108, The Studio, which doubles as a cinema. There is an exhibition space for art installations, a small café and multi-purpose rooms. The centre is owned and administered by Halton Borough Council which runs community events in the building. In 2007, it won the title of 'Best Arts Project in the UK' at the National Lottery Awards. A multiplex cinema run by Cineworld is in Trident Retail Park.

Media

Runcorn is served by two weekly newspapers: the Runcorn & Widnes Weekly News, published by Trinity Mirror North West & North Wales and hosted online by the Liverpool Echo, and the Runcorn and Widnes World, published by Newsquest. The town is also home to Halton Community Radio, a volunteer-run radio station which broadcasts over the Runcorn and Widnes area on the frequency 92.3FM. It was launched on 8 August 2008 with a five-year licence to broadcast.

The BBC situation comedy Two Pints of Lager and a Packet of Crisps was set in Runcorn and included external shots of the former Waterloo Hotel (known in the programme as The Archer), the Silver Jubilee Bridge and Halton Castle. Drop Dead Gorgeous, a drama on BBC Three, was also set in Runcorn. The first two series of the BBC police drama Merseybeat featured sequences of the town and areas of Runcorn old town featured in The Five TV crime drama series on Sky1. Norton Priory has been used as a location in historical dramas, sitcoms and children's programmes, including Little Birds, Bone Detectives (Channel 4), Island at War, Casanova and Young Dracula. The Silver Jubilee Bridge featured in the Netflix series, Stay Close. Runcorn was a setting in the Netflix series, The Last Kingdom, although no scenes were filmed in the town.

Literature
The Runcorn Ferry is a monologue written by Marriott Edgar and popularised by Stanley Holloway celebrating the ancient river crossing which existed from the 12th century until the construction of the Transporter Bridge in 1905. It includes the lines:

Community facilities

The main library is at Runcorn Shopping City with a branch library in the old town centre. A Council 'one stop shop' called Halton Direct Link is based next to the main library.

Open areas in Runcorn form part of Mersey Forest, one of Britain's community forests. In addition to smaller local parks and allotments, there are four large parks in Runcorn:
Town Park forms the centre of the eastern part of the New Town. It is accessible from all of the surrounding communities and links them to Shopping City. There is a privately operated dry ski slope in the park in addition to a volunteer-run 7 1/4" gauge miniature railway, first opened in 1979, which runs through the park for almost a mile.
Phoenix Park adjoins Town Park to the north and includes a cafe, rock climbing wall, skate park and BMX track. There is a pavilion, walking routes along the Bridgewater Canal, woodland walks, a lake, picnic benches and a children's playground. Footpaths lead to Norton Priory.
Runcorn Hill Park and Local Nature Reserve is in the centre of the western part of the town, partly on a dis-used nineteenth-century quarry. It holds a Green Flag Award and incorporates natural woodland and heathland with more formal landscaping, playing fields, a bandstand, model boating lake, sporting facilities and cafe. A Chirotherium dinosaur footprint discovered in the quarry can be viewed in the cafe.
Wigg Island is a large park and nature reserve to the north on the banks of the Mersey and Manchester Ship Canal. The community park was opened on 19 April 2002 by the Mayor of Halton and Bill Oddie. The island is named after Charles Wigg. It covers 23 hectares of a former industrial site and includes several bird watching hides. It is reached via The Old Quay Bridge, a Grade II listed swing bridge built in 1894.

There are three privately run swimming pools at Beechwood Community Centre, INARA club and Holiday Inn Runcorn. The local authority runs two leisure centres and swimming pools at Runcorn Swimming Pool and Brookvale Recreation Centre in addition to outdoor sporting facilities in its parks.

Runcorn's hospital is Halton General Hospital, which is administered by the Warrington and Halton Teaching Hospitals NHS Foundation Trust. It has an Urgent Care Centre but acute medical services are provided by Warrington Hospital. The Cheshire and Merseyside Treatment Centre, a purpose-built hospital for orthopaedic surgery, is on the same site. Halton Haven Hospice is in the Murdishaw area of the town. The body responsible for planning health services in Runcorn, including primary care, is the Halton Clinical Commissioning Group.

Cheshire Constabulary operate a police station adjacent to Runcorn Shopping City in the centre of the New Town and Cheshire Fire and Rescue Service maintains a 24-hour fire station.

Sports

Football
The town has two senior football teams – Runcorn Linnets FC and Runcorn Town FC. It also has a Sunday League and a Junior League. There is an open age women's team, Runcorn Ladies FC, which is affiliated to Liverpool FA and plays in the Liverpool County Women's Open Age Division.

It has several Sunday League teams - Runcorn Sports First Team, Runcorn Sports Third Team, Runcorn Sports U21s, Runcorn Sports Reserves, Runcorn Sports Ladies, and Runcorn Albion. 

The town also has several clubs from U-6 to U-18 level, including Linnets, Weston Point, Beechwood, Brookvale and more - all who play in district leagues and development leagues.

Runcorn Linnets were formed as a trust-based team in 2006 from the now defunct Runcorn F.C. Halton. It has existed in various guises since 1918, and its performance peaked in 1982 when it won the Alliance Premier League, then the highest division below the Football League.

Runcorn Town was formed in 1970 as Mond Rangers FC with the club changing their name in 2005 in order to "try and bring a more professional look to the club in general, and increase support from both businesses and individuals in the local community." After finishing in third place in the West Cheshire League at the end of the 2009/10 season, the club were elected to join the North West Counties League at their AGM, the highest level that they have ever played at.

Rugby
In the late 19th century, and prior to the 1895 schism, rugby union was played at the now defunct Runcorn RFC. When the rugby football schism occurred in 1895, Runcorn became founder members of the Northern Rugby Football Union (now Rugby Football League). Runcorn finished bottom of the league in the 1914–15 season and did not recommence playing in the aftermath of the First World War.

Rugby league in the town is now represented by Runcorn RLC.

Other sports
Runcorn Sports Club in Higher Runcorn hosts several clubs, including Runcorn Cricket Club, Hockey Club, Running Club and Subscription Bowling Club.

Runcorn Rowing Club is sited on the River Weaver Navigation near Clifton Village and also houses Runcorn Canoe Club.

Weston Angling Club Runcorn is a private fishing club which owns Sandymoor Pool in the east of the town.

There is an 18-hole golf course at Runcorn Golf Club in Clifton Road. Nearby is Heath Tennis Club which uses facilities at the Heath School.

Runcorn Ski Centre in Town Park consists of three dry ski slopes: an 85-metre main slope, a 45-metre extended nursery slope, and a 25-metre nursery slope. The centre runs both skiing and snowboarding lessons.

Runcorn had a professional wrestling school and promotion called the Runcorn Wrestling Academy (RWA) from 2005 until 2020, when it closed following allegations of sexual harassment during the Speaking Out movement.

Notable people

Arts and entertainment

Elizabeth Jocelin (1595–1622), writer
Francis William Bourdillon (1852–1921), poet, translator, bibliophile, and scholar
Sir Hall Caine  (1853–1931), novelist, dramatist, short story writer, poet and critic. World War I allied propagandist. Awarded Order of Leopold (Belgium).
Alistair Taylor (1935–2004) assistant to Brian Epstein and General Manager of Apple Corps
Anna Keaveney (1949–2004), actress
Martin Roscoe (born 1952), classical pianist
John Bishop (born 1966), comedian, presenter, and actor
Phil Collins (born 1970), artist
Pete Edmunds (born c. 1972), actor, voice actor, photographer, and artist
Kym Marsh (born 1976), singer and actress
Raymond Waring (born 1977), actor
Susan Nickson (born 1982), television writer and producer
Nicola Roberts (born 1985), singer and member of girl band Girls Aloud

Public service

The Barony of Halton (10711413) comprised a succession of 15 barons; the seat of the Barons of Halton was Halton Castle
Richard Brooke (died 1569), bought the manor of Norton from Henry VIII in 1545
John Savage, 2nd Earl Rivers (c. 1603–1654), politician and royalist
Sir Henry Brooke, 1st Baronet (1611–1664), soldier and politician
Sir John Chesshyre (1662–1738), lawyer
Nathan Alcock (1707–1779), physician
Thomas Alcock (1709–1798), Vicar of Runcorn, writer, cider maker
Thomas Hazlehurst (1816–1876), Methodist who paid for the construction of 12 chapels and three schools in the area
Sir John Rigby PC (1834–1903), judge, politician, and MP for Wisbech
William Allen Whitworth (1840–1905), mathematician and priest in the Church of England
Thomas Alfred Jones VC, DCM (1880–1956), awarded the Victoria Cross and Distinguished Conduct Medal during World War I
Wilson Baker FRS (1900–2002), organic chemist
John Riley Holt FRS (1918–2009), Professor of Experimental Physics at Liverpool University, helped develop the atom bomb

Sports

Harry Speakman (1864–1915), rugby player
Samuel Houghton (1870–1920), rugby player
Jack Fish (1880–1940), rugby player
Dick Padbury (1886–unknown), rugby player
Ernie Shaw (1894–unknown) rugby player
Robert Done (1904–1982), footballer
Bridget Duke-Wooley (1915–1976), alpine skier, competed in the 1948 Winter Olympics
Ray Dutton (born 1945), rugby player
Graham Abel (born 1960), footballer
Robin Reid (born 1971), boxer
Kieron Durkan (1973–2018), footballer
Mike Jackson (born 1973), footballer
Kenny Lunt (born 1979), footballer
Lorna Webb (born 1983), professional cyclist
Scott Brown (born 1985), footballer
Jimmy McNulty (born 1985), footballer
Shauna Coxsey MBE (born 1993), professional rock climber

Business and industry

Thomas Hazlehurst (1779–1842), founder of soap and alkali manufacturer Hazlehurst & Sons
Charles Wigg (1824–1899), manufacturer of chemicals at Wigg Works, which later became Wigg Island
Hamilton Castner (1858–1899), American industrial chemist, formed the Castner-Kellner Alkali Company in Runcorn, which operates the Castner–Kellner process
Sir William Edward Dudley (1868–1938), president of the Co-operative Wholesale Society

See also
List of listed buildings in Runcorn
List of schools in Halton

References
Citations

Sources

Further reading

External links

Runcorn & District Historical Society.
Resource for Urban Development International on Runcorn New Town

 
Towns in Cheshire
New towns in England
Borough of Halton
Liverpool City Region
Unparished areas in Cheshire
New towns started in the 1960s
Port cities and towns in North West England
915 establishments
Populated places established in the 10th century
10th-century establishments in England